Bill Nelson is an American sound engineer. He was nominated for two Academy Awards in the category Best Sound.

Selected filmography
 Heartbreak Ridge (1986)
 Lethal Weapon (1987)

References

External links

Place of birth missing (living people)
Year of birth missing (living people)
Possibly living people
American audio engineers